A toad is any of a number of species within the amphibian order Anura.

Toad may also refer to:

Fictional characters
 Mr. Toad, in Kenneth Grahame's children's novel The Wind in the Willows
 Toad (Marvel Comics) or Mortimer Toynbee, a villain in The X-Men
 Toad (Nintendo), a mushroom-like character in the Mario franchise
 Toad the Brake Van, a character in The Railway Series and in Thomas and Friends
 Toad, a character in the Frog and Toad children's books
 Terry "the Toad", in the movie  American Graffiti

Music
 Toad (band), a Swiss rock band
 Toad (album), their debut album
 "Toad" (instrumental), a 1966 instrumental by Cream from Fresh Cream
 "Toad", a 1994 song by Die Monster Die from Withdrawal Method
 Theory of a Deadman, a Canadian rock band

Other uses
 Toad (solitaire), a solitaire card game
 Toad (software), a database management tool
 Saab Toad, a prototype of the Saab 99
 USS Toad (1914), a United States Navy patrol boat in commission from 1918 to 1919
 The Oxford Artisan Distillery (TOAD), a distillery in Oxford, England
 TOAD, a line of computers by XKL

See also

 Salientia, the clade for frogs, toads, proto-frogs
 True toad, anurans within the family Bufonidae
 Horned toad or horned lizard, various species in the genus Phrynosomatidae
 Toad the Wet Sprocket, an American rock band
 Toadies, an American rock band
 Toads and Frogs
 Frog and Toad
 
 
 Frog (disambiguation)